Luke Davies-Uniacke (born 8 June 1999) is a professional Australian rules footballer playing for the North Melbourne Football Club in the Australian Football League (AFL). He grew up in the seaside town of Rye and attended  Haileybury College. He was drafted by North Melbourne with their first selection and fourth overall in the 2017 national draft.

References

External links

1999 births
Living people
People educated at Haileybury (Melbourne)
North Melbourne Football Club players
Dandenong Stingrays players
Australian rules footballers from Melbourne
People from Mornington Peninsula